The Government College of Arts, Science and Commerce, Khandola is located 500 metres (1,625 feet) from the main town of Marcel, Goa, India. This college offers courses in Bachelor of Science (Computer Science & Microbiology), Bachelor of Commerce, Bachelor of Arts and Master of Arts in Geography.

References

External links
 

Universities and colleges in Goa
Education in North Goa district
Educational institutions in India with year of establishment missing